Lalbhai is a name. Notable people with the name include:

Lalbhai Dalpatbhai (1863-1912), Indian industrialist
Kasturbhai Lalbhai (1894-1980), Indian industrialist
Umedram Lalbhai Desai (1868-1930), Indian medical doctor
Arvind Narottambhai Lalbhai (1918-2007), Indian industrialist

See also
Lalbhai Dalpatram College of Engineering, Indian engineering college
Lalbhai Dalpatbhai Museum, Indian museum